The 2019–20 season is Victoria Libertas Pesaro's 74th in existence and the club's 13th consecutive season in the top flight of Italian basketball.

Overview 
For the 2019-20 season, Pesaro entrusts the team to the young and promising coach Federico Perego, coming from a 5 years experience in the German Basketball Bundesliga as assistant coach of Brose Bamberg and head coach in the second half of his last year.

But the season has an horrible start with a streak of 10 consecutive losses that forces the team to replace Perego with Giancarlo Sacco. Sacco's nomination is a comeback as he started his coaching career with Pesaro in 1984 until 1987 and again as head coach in the 1998–99 season.

However, even with the new coach, Pesaro did not manage to interrupt the losing streak until the first match of the second half of the season against Fortitudo Bologna, after 16 consecutive losses.

The 2019-20 season was hit by the coronavirus pandemic that compelled the federation to suspend and later cancel the competition without assigning the title to anyone. Pesaro ended the championship in the last 17th position with only one match won.

Kit 
Supplier: Erreà / Sponsor: Prosciutto Carpegna DOP

Players 
The team composition is the same as the last game played on February 9 before the interruption of the championship due to the coronavirus pandemic.

Before the official conclusion of the season, four players left the team. Clint Chapman first and Jaylen Barford, who moved to Virtus Roma, left in search for better opportunities, while Troy Williams and Zach Thomas were released after the pandemic to rejoin their families in the US.

Current roster

Depth chart

Squad changes

In

|}

Out

|}

Confirmed 

|}

Coach

Unsuccessful deals 
The following deal never activated and the player's contract was withdrawn before the beginning of the season.

Competitions

Serie A

References 

2019–20 in Italian basketball by club